The Interton Video 3001 is a dedicated first-generation home video game console that was released in 1978 by Interton. It is a Pong clone console and the successor to the Interton Video 3000 and the predecessor of the Interton Video Computer 4000 (VC 4000). It could output games in color.

Games 
Due to the AY-3-8500 chipset, the following 6 games were available to players:

 Tennis
 Fussball
 Squash
 Squash als 2 Spieler Variante
 Schießen 1
 Schießen 2

External links 
Interton Video 3001 at www.old-computers.com
Interton Video 3001 on IMDb

References 

First-generation video game consoles
Dedicated consoles
1970s toys
Video games developed in Germany